Tippatone Sound is a sound system from London, active in the 1980s. It was founded by Robbo Ranx, who was also the sound's selector and producer. The sound also recorded with General Levy.

References

Sound systems